Sporting Clube de Braga - Beach Soccer is a beach soccer club based in Braga, Portugal. The team was created in 2013 and in its first season won the Portuguese National Championship. In 2019 SC Braga won their sixth national championship, defending the titles won in the previous two seasons. They have also won the 2017, 2018, 2019 Euro Winners Cup. Among its players there are 5 Portugal national beach soccer team players. In 2019 they won the Mundialito de Clubes and the first Portuguese Cup. They are currently the defending world, European, and Portuguese champions as well as leaders of the world beach soccer club ranking.

Technical Team

Historical results

International results

National results

Current squad
As of 2019 Mundialito de Clubes

References

S.C. Braga
Beach soccer in Portugal
Beach soccer clubs